Makhdoom Bilawal Bin Jam Hassan Samo, (Born 1451 AD/ 856 AH Sindh) was a sufi saint, philosopher and poet from Sindh, Pakistan. He is also referred as Makhdum Bilal or Bilali Makhdum.

Life 
Makhdoom Bilawal was ordered to be crushed alive in a seed grinder after the Battle of Talti for opposing the conquest of Sindh by Arguns on 30 Safar 929AH/1522 AD.

Poetry 
He said poems in Persian and Sindhi languages. One of his Persian Quatrain reads as follows:

Shrine of Makhdum Bilawal

His shrine is at 'Baghban' near the town of Dadu Sindh, Pakistan. According to the article of Aamir Sindhi Ali Wagan, the mosque at his tomb was constructed by one of his devotees Sardar Sakhi Mahboob Khan Wagan (Chief Sardar of Wagan Tribe).

References

External links

1451 births
1523 deaths
Sufi poets
Sindhi people
Sindhi warriors
Samma tribes
Sindhi-language poets
Sufism in Sindh
Year of birth uncertain